William Alley (also Alleyn and Alleigh; 1510* – 15 April 1570) was an Anglican prelate who was the Bishop of Exeter during the reign of Queen Elizabeth I. Sir William Alley married  Sybil (Bodleigh) Alley in 1534; the two had a total of eight children  

*Alley's date of birth is largely accepted to have been in the year of 1510, though some sources claim dates as far back as 1483 the same citation also lists his birth as having taken place in 1512, and other sources place his birth in 1501  

William Alley is known to the literary world by his Poor Man's Librarie, printed in folio by John Day, London, 1565, or Lectures upon the First Epistle of Saint Peter, red publiquely in the Cathedrall Church of Saint Paule, within the Citye of London, in 1560. Here are adioyned at the ende of euery special treatise, certain fruitful annotacions called miscellanea, because they do entreate of diverse and sundry matters.

Life 
William Alley was a native of Wycombe, Bucks. He was educated at Eton College and finished his studies at the universities of Cambridge and Oxford. While a prebendary of St Paul's Cathedral, London, he was fixed on by Queen Elizabeth to succeed the deprived James Turberville. On 27 April 1560, she issued her congé d'élire to the Dean and Chapter. It was delivered to the president, Chancellor Levison, on 5 May. In the absence of the newly elected dean, Gregory Dodds, the election took place on 20 May and his consecration to the episcopate was held on 14 July that year. 

The revenues of the see and of his chapter had of late been lamentably reduced. But the rectory of Honiton was given to the bishop towards the better maintenance of his rank; and in its parochial church, and even in the rectory-house, he held several ordinations "in Rectoria - in domo Domini Episcopi apud Honyton", as we learn from his registers. Owing to the impoverished state of the finances of his dean and chapter, with the unanimous consent of its members, and under the royal authority, he diminished the number of the canons of the cathedral from twenty-four to nine. His statute for this purpose is dated 22 February 1561. Attempts were made at subsequent periods to set aside this ordinance, which conferred the power and emoluments on the favoured nine, to the exclusion of the other fifteen. It proved useless, however, to combat a practice which had been legalised by time and authority. 

After governing the diocese for about nine and a half years, he died, according to his epitaph, on 15 April 1570, aged 60, and was buried in the choir of his cathedral.

References

Attribution
This article contains text from George Oliver, Lives of the Bishops of Exeter, Broadgate, England: William Roberts, 1861, a work in the public domain.

External links
https://www.geni.com/people/Bishop-William-Alley-Bishop-of-Exeter/6000000003683437670

https://www.wikitree.com/wiki/Alley-144

http://www.tudorplace.com.ar/Bios/WilliamAlley.htm

https://books.google.com/books?id=PYlbAAAAMAAJ&pg=PA106&lpg=PA106&dq=William+Alley+d.+1570&source=bl&ots=GuiqrfyEQ5&sig=dOb5y3OBIqyDYZe6KuN2lNFLWf0&hl=en&sa=X&ved=0CE4Q6AEwCWoVChMIr5Cwp4uKxwIVhho-Ch1XywKm#v=onepage&q=William%20Alley%20d.%201570&f=false

https://books.google.com/books?id=uI4xAQAAMAAJ&pg=PA219&lpg=PA219&dq=William+Alley+d.+1570&source=bl&ots=bCRaI8NvZC&sig=H3AabyPOExgVXstEJc6dV_07ElE&hl=en&sa=X&ved=0CB8Q6AEwATgKahUKEwjT1tiajorHAhXBVT4KHRzVAr8#v=onepage&q=William%20Alley%20d.%201570&f=false

1510 births
1570 deaths
Bishops of Exeter
Diocese of Exeter
English Anglicans
16th-century English writers
16th-century male writers
16th-century Church of England bishops
People from High Wycombe
People educated at Eton College
People of the Tudor period